The Haragan Formation is a geologic formation in Oklahoma. It preserves fossils dating back to the Devonian period.

See also

 List of fossiliferous stratigraphic units in Oklahoma
 Paleontology in Oklahoma

References

 

Devonian geology of Oklahoma
Devonian southern paleotemperate deposits